Reshad Feild (born Richard Timothy Feild; 15 April 1934 – 31 May 2016) was an English mystic, author, spiritual teacher, and musician, who, as Tim Feild, originally came to prominence as a founder member of folk-pop group The Springfields. He was later the author of more than a dozen books about spirituality, and Sufism in particular.

Life and career
Feild was born in Hascombe, Surrey, England, the son of publisher Armistead Littlejohn Feild (1891-1937) and Violet Esmé (1898-1986), daughter of Henry Cumberland Bentley, a brewery director. Feild was educated at Eton and served in the Royal Navy, where he had an undistinguished career. In the early 1960s, Feild formed a folk duo, the Kensington Squares, with Dion O'Brien, later known as Tom Springfield.  When the duo added Dion's sister Mary, they became the Springfields, with Mary becoming known as Dusty Springfield.  The trio had minor pop hits in Britain before Feild left in late 1962; he was replaced by Mike Hurst.

Feild was influenced by the spiritual teachings of G. I. Gurdjieff, P. D. Ouspensky, and others. He studied spiritual healing, and was involved with the Alice Bailey community. In the late 1960s, he was initiated as a sheikh in the Sufi Order International by Pir Vilayat Inayat Khan. Feild studied with Bulent Rauf, a Turkish author and translator descended from a line of Sufi masters going back to the Andalusian mystic Muhyiddin Ibn Arabi (1165–1240). He established the Beshara Centre at Swyre Farm in Aldsworth, England, in 1970. A description of events at this center is given in the books I, Wabenzi by Rafi Zabor, and Beshara and Ibn 'Arabi: A Movement of Sufi Spirituality in the Modern World. 

In December 1971, he and a group of students went to Konya, Turkey, to meet Bulent and the sema of the Mevlevi order of Dervishes. While there, he met Sheikh Suleiman (Süleyman) Dede. In 1972 Feild resigned his role in the Sufi Order. In 1973, he resigned his role leading the Beshara Centre and went to Los Angeles, Tepoztlan, Mexico, and Vancouver Island, BC, where he taught on his own. 

In 1976, he was made a sheikh in the Mevlevi order by Suleiman Dede. This was a revolutionary move, as a Dede of the Mevlevi Order had never bestowed the title of a Sheikh before – Only a Chelebi Efendi, the head of the Mevlevi Order, could bestow such a title. In light of this, Feild's presence as a Mevlevi Sheikh would not have been acknowledged by the central governing of the Mevlevi Order, and could be best viewed as a transformatory off-shoot of the Order.

After receiving the rank of Sheikh, Reshad Feild moved to Boulder, Colorado, where he started a small centre. In Boulder Reshad assisted in introducing the sema ceremony – which was declared a cultural world heritage activity by UNESCO in 2004 – to America and Europe, and made it available to women for the first time in recent history, as well as non-Muslim participants (i.e. students).

Later, Feild taught on the essence of the universality of Sufi teachings, making them available to people of all religious and spiritual backgrounds. He published more than a dozen books, some of which have been translated into many languages. In his autobiographical novel The Last Barrier, he gave a fictionalised account of how he met Bulent Rauf.

He was the father of the actor JJ Feild.

Published works
The Last Barrier – A True Story of a Journey into Ultimate Reality (autobiographical trilogy part I) 
To Know We're Loved – The Invisible Way (autobiographical trilogy part II) 
Going Home – The Journey of a Travelling Man (Autobiographical trilogy part III) 
The Alchemy of the Heart 
Steps to Freedom: Discourses on the Essential Knowledge of the Heart 
Here to Heal 
Reason Is Powerless in the Expression of Love 
Footprints in the Sand 
A Travelling People's Feild Guide 
Breathing Alive – A Guide to Conscious Living 
The Inner Work (3 volumes) ,  and 
Breathe for God's Sake! Discourses on the Mystical Art and Science of Breath

References

External links
Biography of Reshad Feild at Chalice Publishing
Videos of Reshad Feild
Chalice: A Living School – Reshad Feild's Esoteric School, Chalice Foundation
 Virginia Lee, "Reshad Feild: Sufi and Healer", Yoga Journal, October 1982, pp.26–32

1934 births
2016 deaths
English folk musicians
English Sufis
People educated at Eton College
English spiritual writers
English spiritual teachers
Royal Navy officers
People from the Borough of Waverley